This list catalogs the most honored US Naval vessels of the Second World War. It is placed in descending order of earned Battle Stars; descending accorded unit recognitions; descending ship size by type; and ascending hull number. It contains only vessels that earned fifteen or more Battle Stars for World War II service.

Honors awarded that are not listed may include:
 Honors awarded by countries other than the United States (e.g., Philippine Presidential Unit Citation, British Admiralty Pennant)
 Honors awarded to all units for serving active duty during World War II; including active duty before US entry in the war (e.g., American Defense Service Medal, American Campaign Medal, Asiatic-Pacific Campaign Medal, World War II Victory Medal)
 Honors awarded to vessels for campaigns other than World War II service (e.g. Korean War service, Vietnam War service).

References

United States Navy in World War II